Solidago simplex, the Mt. Albert goldenrod or sticky goldenrod, is a North American plant species in the genus Solidago of the family Asteraceae. It is widespread across much of Canada, parts of the United States, and northeastern Mexico.

Description
Solidago simplex is a perennial herb up to 80 cm (32 inches) tall, with a branching underground caudex. One plant system can produce as many as 10 stems. Leaves are long and narrow, up to 16 cm (6.6 inches) long, produced on the stem as well as at the base. One stem can sometimes produce as many as 150 small yellow flower heads, each with 7-16 ray florets surrounding 6-31 disc florets.

Varieties
At least eight varieties of the species may be recognised:
Solidago simplex var. chlorolepis (Fernald) G. S. Ringius - Mt. Albert, Gaspé Peninsula, Québec
Solidago simplex var. gillmanii (A.Gray) G.S.Ringius - shores of Lake Michigan + Lake Huron
Solidago simplex var. monticola (Porter) G.S.Ringius - mountains in Québec, New York State, New England
Solidago simplex var. nana (A.Gray) G.S.Ringius - Cascade Mountains in Oregon and Washington, Vancouver Island in British Columbia
Solidago simplex var. ontarioensis (G.S.Ringius) G.S.Ringius - shores on Canadian side of Lake Huron
Solidago simplex var. racemosa (Greene) G.S.Ringius - from Québec and New Brunswick south as far as West Virginia
Solidago simplex var. randii (Porter) Kartesz & Gandhi  - from Québec and New Brunswick west as far as Minnesota
Solidago simplex var. simplex - from Alaska east to Northwest Territories + Quebec, south as far as Arizona, Nuevo León, San Luis Potosí

References

External links
Photo of herbarium specimen collected in Nuevo León in 1962

simplex
Flora of North America
Plants described in 1818